The Tombstone Unified School District is the school district for Tombstone, Arizona and surrounding areas. It was organized in 1922. The superintendent is Robert Devere.

Schools operated
Huachuca City Elementary
Walter J. Meyer Elementary
Tombstone High School

References

External links
 

School districts in Cochise County, Arizona
Tombstone, Arizona
1922 establishments in Arizona